Adamus may refer to:

Adămuș, a commune in Mureș County, Transylvania, Romania
Latin form of the given name Adam
Adamus (surname), people with the name
Pomus Adamus

See also
Adam (disambiguation)
Adamu, a given name and surname